John Bradstock is a former  Australian rugby league footballer who played in the 1970s.

Playing career
Bradstock was a winger for the Newtown club for five seasons in the 1970s and was the leading tryscorer in first grade for the 1972 season . He also represented New South Wales on one occasion during his debut season. 
His brothers Barry and Kevin also played first grade at the Jets.

Bradstock retired in 1977.

References

1950 births
Living people
Newtown Jets players
Australian rugby league players
New South Wales rugby league team players
Rugby league centres
Rugby league players from Sydney